is the second studio album by singer and cellist Kanon Wakeshima. The song "Toumei no Kagi" was released as a digital download prior to the release of the album on September 16, 2009. The song was used as the theme song of the online game Avalon no Kagi. A promotional music video for the song "Lolitawork Libretto ~Storytelling by Solita~" was also released prior to the album.

The album charted at No. 83 on the Oricon Albums Charts and only charted for one week.

The official full title of the album is "Lolitawork Libretto: A Libretto on What Makes a Girl Work".

Track listing

Personnel
 Kanon Wakeshima – Vocals, Cello, Piano, Lyrics

References 

2010 albums
Neoclassical albums